3 Persei is a single, orange-hued star in the northern constellation of Perseus.

This star has a stellar classification of K0 IV, suggesting it is a K-type subgiant – an evolved star that has used up its core hydrogen and is evolving to become a red giant. However, da Silva et al. (2015) categorized it as a giant star proper. At the age of around three billion years, it has an estimated 1.4 times the mass of the Sun and has expanded to move than 8 times the Sun's radius. It is radiating roughly 37 times the Sun's luminosity from its enlarged photosphere at an effective temperature of 4,757 K.

References

K-type subgiants
Perseus (constellation)
Durchmusterung objects
Persei, 03
011949
009222
0568